The Paseo de Aguas is a tourist boulevard in Trujillo city in northern Peru. One of its main attractions is the  Tunnel of Wishes, formed by arches of water with multicolor effects. It also has a round pool with  multicolored jets of water arranged in circular form with spaces where people can walk into the pool. It is located at the intersection of Larco with Victor Raul Haya de la Torre avenues, near Cesar Vallejo University.

Description
It is located in Victor Larco district at 17th block of Larco avenue and it was built in 2011 in its first stage. In the Paseo de Aguas are held events like concerts, food festivals, etc. It is visited by people of Trujillo city mainly.

See also

Historic Centre of Trujillo
Chan Chan
Huanchaco
Puerto Chicama
Chimu
Pacasmayo beach
Plaza de Armas of Trujillo
Moche
Víctor Larco Herrera District
Vista Alegre
Buenos Aires
Las Delicias beach
Independence of Trujillo
Wall of Trujillo
Santiago de Huamán
Lake Conache
Marinera Festival
Trujillo Spring Festival
Wetlands of Huanchaco
Association of Breeders and Owners of Paso Horses in La Libertad
Salaverry beach
Puerto Morín
Virú culture
Marcahuamachuco
Wiracochapampa

External links
Location of "Paseo de Aguas" in Trujillo (Wikimapia)
"Huaca de la luna and Huaca del sol"
"Huacas del Sol y de la Luna Archaeological Complex", Official Website
Information on El Brujo Archaeological Complex
Chan Chan World Heritage Site, UNESCO
Chan Chan conservation project
Website about Trujillo, Reviews, Events, Business Directory
Municipality of Trujillo

Multimedia
 
 
 
 Gallery pictures of Trujillo by Panoramio, Includes Geographical information by various authors
Colonial Trujillo photos

References

Geography of Trujillo, Peru
Tourist attractions in Trujillo, Peru
Streets in Trujillo, Peru